Katsuaki Fujiwara (born 27 March 1975 in Shimonoseki, Yamaguchi Prefecture, Japan) is a former professional motorcycle racer. He last competed in the Asia Road Race Championship in the SS600 class aboard a Kawasaki ZX-6R, where he was champion in 2011 and runner-up behind Ryuichi Kiyonari in 2012 and 2013 behind Azlan Shah Kamaruzaman. He is mostly known for his time spent in the Supersport World Championship, a championship he gained his best result of second overall in 2002. He has also raced in the Superbike World Championship, and in the All Japan Road Race Championship.

References

External links
MotoGP.com rider profile
WorldSBK.com rider profile

Japanese motorcycle racers
500cc World Championship riders
Superbike World Championship riders
Supersport World Championship riders
1975 births
Living people
People from Shimonoseki